Dhakuakhana Assembly constituency is one of the 126 assembly constituencies of Assam Legislative Assembly. Dhakuakhana forms part of the Lakhimpur Lok Sabha constituency.

Dhakuakhana Assembly constituency details

Following are details on Dhakuakhana Assembly constituency-

Country: India.
 State: Assam.
 District: Lakhimpur district .
 Lok Sabha Constituency: Lakhimpur Lok Sabha/Parliamentary.
 Assembly Categorisation: Rural constituency.
 Literacy Level:89.12%.
 Eligible Electors as per 2021 General Elections: 2,10,546 Eligible Electors. Male Electors:1,06,037 . Female Electors:1,04,509 .
 Geographic Co-Ordinates:  27°13'32.5"N 94°25'21.0"E..
 Total Area Covered:  683  square kilometres.
 Area Includes: Kadam mouza in North Lakhimpur thana and Gohain and Dhakuakhana mouzas in Dhakuakhana thana in Dhemaji sub- division, of Lakhimpur district of Assam.
 Inter State Border :Jorhat.
 Number Of Polling Stations: Year 2011-204,Year 2016-222,Year 2021-112.

Members of Legislative Assembly 

Following is the list of past members representing Dhakuakhana Assembly constituency in Assam Legislature.

 1962: Lalit Kumar Doley, Indian National Congress.
 1967: N. Pegu, Communist Party of India.
 1972: Lakhya Nath Doley, Indian National Congress.
 1978: Lakhya Nath Doley, Indian National Congress.
 1983: Ragunath Pamegam, Indian National Congress.
 1985: Bharat Narah, Independent (politician).
 1991: Bharat Narah, Asom Gana Parishad.
 1996: Bharat Narah, Indian National Congress.
 2001: Bharat Narah, Indian National Congress.
 2006: Bharat Narah, Indian National Congress.
 2011: Naba Kumar Doley, Asom Gana Parishad.
 2016: Naba Kumar Doley, Bharatiya Janata Party.

Election results

2016 result

External links

See also
 Golaghat district
 Dergaon
 List of constituencies of Assam Legislative Assembly

References 

Assembly constituencies of Assam